Lyn or LYN may refer to:

People
 Lyn (singer), South Korean singer
 Lyn (gamer), South Korean Warcraft III player
 Lyn (given name)
 Lyn (surname)

In science and technology
 Lynx (constellation), standard abbreviation
 Lyn (locomotive), a British narrow gauge railway locomotive built in 1897 for the Lynton and Barnstaple Railway
 Lyn (Src family kinase), in biochemistry
 LyN, a video game engine

In fiction
 Lyn Me, a character in the Star Wars universe
 Lyndis, a character from the Fire Emblem series

Other uses
 Lyn, Ontario, Canada, a community within the township of Elizabethtown-Kitley
 Lyon–Bron Airport (IATA code LYN)
 Lyn Fotball, Norwegian football club from Oslo established in 1896

See also
Lynn (disambiguation)
Lin (disambiguation)

Unisex given names